In Greek mythology, Amphinomus (Amphínomos; literally "grazing all about") may refer to the following personages:

 Amphinomus, the Aetolian father of Thyrie (Hyria) who became the mother of Cycnus by Apollo.
 Amphinomus, a prince of Dulichium as the son of King Nisos. He was one of the suitors of Penelope and was considered the best-behaved of them. Despite Odysseus's warning, Amphinomus was compelled by Athena to stay, as he had been a suitor nonetheless.  He was killed by a spear thrown by Telemachus during the murder of the suitors; ironically, Amphinomous had twice tried to dissuade the suitors from killing Telemachus.
 Amphinomus, son of Diomedes and the daughter of King Daunus of Apulia in Italy.

Notes

References 
Antoninus Liberalis, The Metamorphoses of Antoninus Liberalis translated by Francis Celoria (Routledge 1992). Online version at the Topos Text Project.
Apollodorus, The Library with an English Translation by Sir James George Frazer, F.B.A., F.R.S. in 2 Volumes, Cambridge, MA, Harvard University Press; London, William Heinemann Ltd. 1921. ISBN 0-674-99135-4. Online version at the Perseus Digital Library. Greek text available from the same website.
Homer, The Odyssey with an English Translation by A.T. Murray, PH.D. in two volumes. Cambridge, MA., Harvard University Press; London, William Heinemann, Ltd. 1919. . Online version at the Perseus Digital Library. Greek text available from the same website.

Princes in Greek mythology
Suitors of Penelope
Characters in the Odyssey

Aetolian characters in Greek mythology
Aetolian mythology